Events in the year 2015 in Namibia.

Incumbents 

 President: Hifikepunye Pohamba (until 21 March), Hage Geingob (from 21 March)
 Vice President: Nickey Iyambo (from 21 March)
 Prime Minister: Hage Geingob (until 21 March), Saara Kuugongelwa (from 21 March)
 Chief Justice of Namibia: Peter Shivute

Events 

 27 November – Local and regional elections were held in the country using electronic voting.

Deaths

References 

 
2010s in Namibia
Years of the 21st century in Namibia
Namibia
Namibia